David Guthrie Catcheside FRS (31 May 1907 – 1 June 1994) was a British plant geneticist.

He was educated at Strand School and King's College London (BSc). He was a Lecturer in Botany at King's College London from 1933 to 1936, and at the University of Cambridge from 1937 to 1950. He was Professor of Genetics at the University of Adelaide from 1952 to 1955, Professor of Microbiology at the University of Birmingham from 1956 to 1964, and Professor of Genetics at the Australian National University from 1964 to 1972.

He was made a Fellow of the Royal Society in 1951. He was also a Fellow of King's College London and a Fellow of Trinity College, Cambridge.

Studies 
In 1931, David Catcheside proposed the idea that there is evidence of parasynapsis within Oenothera plants, based on their chromosomal arrangement.

Recognition
The D.G Catcheside Prize, awarded by the Genetics Society of Australia to the top doctoral student in the field of genetics, was named for him.

Bibliography

References

1907 births
1994 deaths
People educated at the Strand School
Alumni of King's College London
Fellows of King's College London
Fellows of the Royal Society
Academics of King's College London
Academics of the University of Cambridge
Fellows of Trinity College, Cambridge
Academic staff of the University of Adelaide
Academics of the University of Birmingham
Academic staff of the Australian National University
Fellows of the Australian Academy of Science
Foreign associates of the National Academy of Sciences